Pedro Quintero Arreitunandia (born 24 July 1974 in Pontevedra) is a Spanish former professional cyclist.

Major results

1997
 1st Stage 2 Vuelta a Navarra
1999
 6th Overall Tour de l'Avenir
2001
 1st  Overall Vuelta a Palencia
 1st  Overall Vuelta a Tenerife
2002
 3rd Overall Troféu Joaquim Agostinho
 4th Overall Volta a Portugal
 7th Clásica a los Puertos
2003
 1st Stage 9 Volta a Portugal
 3rd Clásica a los Puertos
 4th Overall Troféu Joaquim Agostinho
 8th GP Villafranca de Ordizia
2004
 7th GP Llodio
 9th Subida a Urkiola
2005
 3rd Overall Setmana Catalana de Ciclisme
 3rd Overall Brixia Tour
 4th Overall Euskal Bizikleta
1st Stage 3
 4th Overall Vuelta a Murcia
1st Stage 4
 5th Overall Volta a Portugal
 6th Klasika Primavera
 9th Gran Premio Miguel Induráin
2006
 4th Overall Euskal Bizikleta
 6th Overall Clásica Internacional de Alcobendas
2007
 2nd Gran Premio di Lugano
 3rd Subida al Naranco
 8th Coppa Placci

References

External links

1974 births
Living people
Spanish male cyclists
Sportspeople from Pontevedra
Cyclists from Galicia (Spain)
Sportspeople from Gipuzkoa
Cyclists from the Basque Country (autonomous community)
People from Debabarrena